Creators: The Past is an Italian science fiction fantasy film directed by Piergiuseppe Zaia. It stars Eleonora Fani, Jennifer Mischiati, Bruce Payne and Per Fredrik Åsly in the lead roles, and features guest appearances by Gérard Depardieu and William Shatner.  Zaia cowrote the screenplay with Eleonora Fani. The story is about how the destinies of mankind are being manipulated by a race of powerful extraterrestrials known as the Creators. The film was announced as the first part of a planned trilogy,  with the next two installments being Creators: The Present and Creators: The Future. Principal photography began in 2014, but the film did not reach theaters before 2020. Its release in Italy eventually suffered from the COVID-19 pandemic.

Plot
The film provides a fictional explanation as to why the Mayan prophecy did not come to pass. As the end of the year 2012 arrives, the universe is about to undergo an extraordinary planetary alignment which will cause a total eclipse to be visible from planet Earth. The eight members of the Galactic Council regulating the stability of the universe gather to discuss the effects of the coming alignment. Each of the godlike members of the Council is a "Creator" governing their own planet. All the data regarding the planets, including the secrets about the DNA of their respective species, are recorded into mystical objects known as the lens.

Following the rebellion of Lord Kanaff, the regent of planet Earth, the Galactic Council loses control of the lens which contains the recording of the entire history and the memories of humanity. The data contained in the object includes the secret that mankind was created by aliens and that all religions are a sham to keep humanity under control. Sofy, a young woman who was abducted as a child by aliens, is entrusted by the Creators with the task of locating the missing lens. The female warrior Lady Airre is sent by the council of the Creators to capture Lord Kanaff. Meanwhile, another Creator, Lord Kal, has been secretly plotting to take control of Earth through the Illuminati, in order to replace his own dying planet.

Cast
Eleonora Fani as Lady Airre, an emissary of the Creators
Bruce Payne as Lord Kal, a villainous Creator who wants to take control of planet Earth
Jennifer Mischiati as Sofy, a young woman entrusted with finding the missing lens
Per Fredrik Åsly as Alex Walker, a young doctor who helps Sofy in her quest
Marc Fiorini as Lord Kanaff, the regent of planet Earth
William Shatner as Lord Ogmha, chairman of the Creators' Galactic Council
Gérard Depardieu as the Master of Faith, an agent of the Creators who secretly oversees all of Earth's religions
Ksenia Prohaska as Dr. Ferrari, one of Lord Kal's evil minions
Angelo Minoli as Natan, a man created by Lady Airre using the DNA of Jesus Christ
Sébastien Foucan as Tammuz, Natan's "brother"
Yohann Chopin as Chris Walker
Elio Pascarelli as Young Natan
Elisabetta Coraini as Elizabeth
Pete Antico as Lord Marduk, a member of the Galactic council
Daniel McVicar as Dan Anderson
Kristina Pimenova as Singing Child
Jonna Cambrand as Joro
Brian Ayres as Potentate
Nicole Orlando as Young girl in hospital
Mauro Biglino as himself
Piergiuseppe Zaia as Jesus Christ

Production
The film originated with a project by music composer and festival organizer Piergiuseppe Zaia and psychologist and alternative medicine therapist Eleonora Fani. Zaia and Fani co-wrote the screenplay, with Zaia directing the film and Fani playing one of the lead roles. The film was shot on location in Italy, mostly in the Piedmont region. Locations included the province of Biella and the historical area of Canavese in Piedmont, as well as the Aosta Valley and Venice. Some scenes were filmed at the Verrès Castle and the Castle Savoia. The city of Biella and its province were actively involved in the making of the film, for which they provided locations as well as funding.

Principal photography started in 2014. The first scenes involving Gérard Depardieu and Bruce Payne were shot in october of that year. Post-production took place at FotoKem in Burbank. The film, originally slated for a release in February 2016, remained unreleased at that date. In December 2017, director Zaia said that the film was "almost ready" for worldwide distribution and that it had been delayed in part due to the extensive use of green screen and special effects, and to the addition of new scenes involving new actors. As the film had been shot in english, the italian dubbing had not yet been completed at that point.

Promotion 
The official trailer was shown on January 17, 2019 on Vimeo. A novelization was released on February 2020 only in Italian.

Soundtrack
The theme song "Across Endless Dimensions" is performed by Dimash Kudaibergen. Director Piergiuseppe Zaia composed the song as well as the rest of the soundtrack.

Release
The film's trailer was released on March 6, 2019. Also in 2019, the film premiered in China at Shanghai International Film Festival and in Santa Monica, United States at Atlas International Film Exhibition. A promotional tour commenced in Italy at Lucca Comics & Games festival. The film was first set to be theatrically released on March 13, 2020 but this was delayed due the COVID-19 pandemic. The film was then released in cinemas in Italy on October 8, 2020, for two weeks only however. The film was released to streaming on February 7, 2023, on Amazon Prime, licensed exclusively in Italy and Vatican City, with only Italian Dubs, even though English Dubs are in fact known to have been completed.

Reception
Giancarlo Zappoli of mymovies.it stated that the film's two strengths were its notable cast and the foray into fantasy and sci-fi (which is pioneering for Italian films) but that the screenplay suffered from an abundance of subplots. Valerio Molinaro of Corriere spettacolo praised the film's scenography and its "first-rate choral cast" but found the screenplay "not always up to par". Antonio Palazzo of extratek.com commented that the film "is an ambitious all-Italian Blockbuster, with an excellent background story" and good performances from "world-famous actors" but that the screenplay was often confusing and that the film's running time did not allow the story to develop as it should have. Fiaba Di Martino of Film TV magazine criticized the screenplay and the underwritten characters, and compared the movie to an overenthusiastic fan film made for YouTube. Martina Catrambone of themacguffin.it wrote that the writing, editing, music and special effects did not make any sense, and stated that such a film proved that Italian cinema should avoid science fiction. Alberto Mutignani of the online magazine The Walk of Fame called it "the worst film of the year", stating that the film ended up being an unintentional comedy, with a story so confusing that one wondered if some scenes were missing. A reviewer for the website  Nerdevil.it panned the film for its confusing screenplay and uneven performances, and noted that while the story deserved some praise for its originality, it also alluded to all sorts of conspiracy theories, as evidenced by the cameo of author Mauro Biglino.

Creators: the Past ranked ninth at the Italian box office during its first weekend, earning 69,000 euros. It eventually earned 120,000 euros before its release was cut short by the COVID-19 pandemic.

In January 2021, director Piergiuseppe Zaia stated that despite the film's aborted release, he and Fani were working on what would be the second installment of the trilogy.

References

External links
 
 

Italian science fiction films
2020 films
2020 science fiction films
English-language Italian films
Films shot in Italy
Films shot in Aosta Valley
Italian fantasy films
Films about conspiracy theories
Alien visitations in films
Alien abduction films
Secret histories
Films critical of religion
Films set in Piedmont
2020 fantasy films
Films postponed due to the COVID-19 pandemic
2020s English-language films